"Glory" is the fifth single by Japanese rock band Band-Maid, released in Japan on January 16, 2019, by Crown Stones. The song was used as the second ending theme for the second season of the anime Yu-Gi-Oh! VRAINS. It was released on the same day as "Bubble".

Composition and lyrics
The lyrics for "Glory" were inspired by the anime Yu-Gi-Oh! VRAINS and describes a world where AIs and human coexist. Rhythm guitarist/vocalist Miku Kobato stated that the English lyrics in the song were made intentionally easy to sing, as they found that many kids watched the show.

The lyrics for "Hide-and-Seek" revolve around a darker version of hide-and-seek, where the outcome is life or death. It was based on a demo that lead guitarist Kanami Tōno had written and set aside for later use.

Critical reception
JaME said that the title track "...accelerates right from the start with its igniting opening riff, maintaining the speed over the course of the song with excellent drumming and ‘bouncing’ choruses." And that "Hide and Seek" "...will definitely fire up the crowd during gigs with its speed".

Music video
The music video for "Glory" was released on November 2, 2018.

Live performances
Live versions of "Glory" were later released on their video albums Band-Maid World Domination Tour [Shinka] at Line Cube Shibuya (Shibuya Public Hall) and Band-Maid Online Okyu-Ji (Feb. 11, 2021).

Track listing
CD

Credits and personnel
Band-Maid members
 Misa – bass
 Miku Kobato – vocals, guitar
 Saiki Atsumi – vocals
 Akane Hirose – drums
 Kanami Tōno – guitar

Recording and management
 Recorded at Nasoundra Palace Studio
 Recording engineer: Masyoshi Yamamoto
 Mixed at Mix Forest
 Mix engineer: Masahiko Fukui
 Mastered by Masahiko Fukui
 Design by Akira Yamaguchi, Kazu Yamamoto, Misaki Fujioka

Charts

Release history

References

External links 
 Discography – Band-Maid official website

2019 singles
Band-Maid songs
Japanese-language songs
Anime songs